The team jumping was an equestrian event held as part of the Equestrian at the 1964 Summer Olympics programme.  The event was held on 24 October, and consisted merely of summing the scores of the team's 3 horse and rider pairs in the individual jumping event.

Medalists

Results

Pairs not completing the first round were assigned a penalty of 86.25; those not completing the second received a 71.25.

References

Sources
 

Equestrian at the 1964 Summer Olympics